Ján Kubiš (born 12 November 1952) is a Slovak diplomat. He is a former Minister of Foreign Affairs. He was appointed as United Nations Special Coordinator for Lebanon in 2019 by the United Nations Secretary-General António Guterres, and as head of the United Nations Support Mission in Libya in January 2021.

Early life
Born in 1952, Kubiš studied international economic relations at the Moscow State Institute of International Relations.

Career

Career with the United Nations
From 2015 until 2018, Kubiš served as the Special Representative and Head of the United Nations Assistance Mission in Iraq (UNAMI); he was appointed to this position by the United Nations Secretary-General Ban Ki-moon on 5 February 2015. Also, he was the Special Representative and Head of the United Nations Assistance Mission in Afghanistan (UNAMA). Previously, he served as the Executive Secretary of the United Nations Economic Commission for Europe, and was the Minister of Foreign Affairs of Slovakia from July 2006 until January 2009.

Later on, he served as the Special Representative of the Secretary-General for the United Nations Assistance Mission in Iraq (2015–2018), United Nations Special Coordinator for Lebanon in 2019, and head of the United Nations Support Mission in Libya in 2021.

Kubiš resigned from the Libya mission on November 23, 2021.

Career with the OSCE
Kubiš was formerly Organization for Security and Co-operation in Europe (OSCE) Secretary General. In July 2005, the European Union appointed Kubiš to be the EU's special envoy to Central Asia. Kubiš had previously served as the United Nations special envoy to Tajikistan from 1998 to 1999, during the transitional period following the civil war until the country held its first postwar elections.

Prior to taking on the post as OSCE Secretary General, Kubiš was Director of the Conflict Prevention Centre in the secretariat of the OSCE, a position he held from 1994.

Career in the Slovak diplomatic service
From 1993 to 1994, Kubiš was Ambassador and Permanent Representative of the Slovak Republic to the UN Office in Geneva, as well as to the General Agreement on Tariffs and Trade and other international organizations. In 1994, Kubiš was Special Ministerial Envoy and Slovak Chief Negotiator on the Pact for Stability in Europe. In 1992, he served as Chairman-in-Office of the Committee of Senior Officials of the Committee on Security and Cooperation in Europe (CSCE) under the Czechoslovak CSCE chairmanship.

From 1991 to 1992, Kubiš was Director-General of the Euro-Atlantic Section in the Ministry of Foreign Affairs in Prague. From 1989, he served in the Czechoslovak Embassy in Moscow, and as Deputy Head of the Embassy from 1990 until his departure in 1991. Between 1985 and 1988, he headed the section dealing with security and arms control in the Czechoslovak Foreign Ministry. From 1980 to 1985, he served in the Czechoslovak Embassy in Addis Ababa, Ethiopia.

Personal life
He is married and has one daughter.

References

|-

|-

|-

|-

|-

1952 births
Foreign Ministers of Slovakia
Direction – Social Democracy politicians
European Union diplomats
Living people
Special Representatives of the Secretary-General of the United Nations
Moscow State Institute of International Relations alumni
Organization for Security and Co-operation in Europe
Diplomats from Bratislava
Politicians from Bratislava
Under-Secretaries-General of the United Nations
Slovak officials of the United Nations
Slovak officials of the European Union
OSCE Secretaries General